Surakayevo (Suraqay) is a rural locality (a khutor) in Krivle-Ilyushkinsky Selsoviet, Kuyurgazinsky District, Bashkortostan, Russia. The population was 5 as of 2010. There is 1 street.

Geography 
Surakayevo is located 32 km southeast of Yermolayevo (the district's administrative centre) by road. Kinzyabayevo is the nearest rural locality.

References 

Rural localities in Kuyurgazinsky District